Maire Leadbeater (née Locke, born 19 October 1945), is a New Zealand human rights and peace activist, writer, and former social worker. Leadbeater played a leading role in the New Zealand branch of the Campaign for Nuclear Disarmament and has also advocated on human rights issues relating to East Timor, the Philippines, and Indonesia. She also served as a councillor on the Auckland City Council and Auckland Regional Council.

Family
Leadbeater is the daughter of Jack and Elsie Locke, and has three siblings; Keith Locke, Alison Locke, and Don Locke.

Local government career
She was also a councillor in the Auckland City Council and the Auckland Regional Council, who campaigned under the centre-left ticket body City Vision.

Activism
During the 1980s and 1990s, Leadbeater served as the media spokesperson for the New Zealand Campaign for Nuclear Disarmament, which successfully campaigned for a New Zealand nuclear-free zone and a ban on visits by nuclear-armed and nuclear-powered ships. She was also involved in various other human rights groups including the Auckland East Timor Independence Committee, the Philippines Solidarity Network of Aotearoa and the Indonesia Human Rights Committee. Her family's left-wing activities made her the target of surveillance by the New Zealand Security Intelligence Service, the country's main domestic intelligence agency.

Writings

References

Auckland City Councillors
Living people
New Zealand anti-war activists
New Zealand anti–nuclear weapons activists
New Zealand left-wing activists
New Zealand women activists
People from Auckland
Auckland regional councillors
1945 births